Ncholu Monontsi (born 2 April 1963) is a Lesotho boxer. He competed in the men's light middleweight event at the 1988 Summer Olympics.

References

1963 births
Living people
Lesotho male boxers
Olympic boxers of Lesotho
Boxers at the 1988 Summer Olympics
Place of birth missing (living people)
Light-middleweight boxers